Senator Land may refer to:

Clay D. Land (born 1960), Georgia State Senate
John C. Land III (born 1941), South Carolina State Senate
John Henry Land (1918–2011), Georgia State Senate
Paul Land (politician) (1853–1919), Washington State Senate
Ted J. Land (1936–2018), Georgia State Senate